Persico  is an Italian surname, which means Persian as in "Golfo Persico" (Italian for Persian Gulf). Notable people with the surname include:

 Aaron Persico, Italian rugby player
 Alphonse Persico, American mobster nicknamed "Allie Boy"
 Carmine Persico, American mobster
 Daniel Pérsico, politician
 Enrico Persico, Italian physicist
 Ignatius Persico, Italian Cardinal
 Joseph E. Persico, author
 Lawrence T. Persico, Bishop of Erie, Pennsylvania
 Salvatore Persico, birth name of baseball catcher Joe Smith
 Silvia Persico, Italian cyclist

See also 

 Persico (disambiguation)

Italian-language surnames